Klipkopjes Dam is an earth-fill type dam located on the White River, near the town of White River, Mpumalanga, South Africa. It was established in 1960 and its primary purpose is to serve for irrigation. The hazard potential of the dam has been ranked high (3).

See also
List of reservoirs and dams in South Africa
List of rivers of South Africa

References 

 List of South African Dams from the Department of Water Affairs

Dams in South Africa
Dams completed in 1960